Metán is a department located in Salta Province, in Argentina.

With an area of  it borders to the north with the departments of General Güemes and Anta, to the east with Anta, to the south with Santiago del Estero Province and Rosario de la Frontera Department, and to the west with Guachipas Department, La Viña Department, and Capital Department.

History 
The department was created during the government of Manuel Solá (1859-1860) with territories ceded by the Rosario de la Frontera Department.

Towns and municipalities
 San José de Metán
 El Galpón
 Río Piedras 
 El Tunal
 Lumbreras
 Metán Viejo
 San José de Orquera
 Presa El Tunal
 Alto del Mistol
 Bajo Grande
 Esteco
 Juramento
 Las Juntas
 Ovejería
 Punta de Agua
 Ricardo Schneidewind
 Yatasto
 El Naranjo
 Paraje del Juramento

References

External links 
 Departments of Salta Province website

Departments of Salta Province